Ancylosis pectinatella is a species of snout moth in the genus Ancylosis. It was described by Joseph de Joannis in 1915 and is known from Mauritius.

Taxonomy
The name Ancylosis pectinatella is preoccupied by the species described by Émile Louis Ragonot in 1887. This means the species described by de Joannis needs to be renamed, but no replacement name has yet been given.

The wingspan of this species is 23 mm.
Its larvae had been found in February on sugar-apples (Annona squamosa).

References

Moths described in 1915
Phycitini
Moths of Mauritius
Moths of Réunion